TrES-4b is an extrasolar planet, and one of the largest exoplanets ever found, after WASP-12b, WASP-17b, CT Chamaeleontis b (though the latter may be a brown dwarf), GQ Lupi b and HD 100546 b. It was discovered in 2006, and announced in 2007, by the Trans-Atlantic Exoplanet Survey, using the transit method.

Orbit
A 2008 study concluded that the GSC 06200-00648 system (among others) is a binary star system allowing even more accurate determination of stellar and planetary parameters.

TrES-4 orbits its primary star every 3.543 days and eclipses it when viewed from Earth. 

The study in 2012, utilizing a Rossiter–McLaughlin effect, have determined the planetary orbit is probably aligned with the equatorial plane of the star, misalignment equal to 6.3°.

Physical characteristics
The planet is slightly less massive than Jupiter (0.919 ± 0.073 ) but its diameter is 79.9% larger; it was considered the largest planet ever found at the time, giving it an average density of only about 1/3 gram per cubic centimetre, approximately the same as Saturn's moon Methone. This made TrES-4 both the largest known planet and the planet with the lowest known density at the time of its discovery.

TrES-4's orbital radius is 0.05091 AU, giving it a predicted surface temperature of about 1782 K. This by itself is not enough to explain the planet's low density, however. It is not currently known why TrES-4 is so large. The probable causes are the proximity to a parent star that is 3–4 times more luminous than the Sun as well as the internal heat within the planet.

See also
 List of exoplanet extremes
 WASP-17b, another large exoplanet

References

External links

 
 
 
 

Hercules (constellation)
Hot Jupiters
Transiting exoplanets
Exoplanets discovered in 2006
Giant planets